The 1915 Washington football team was an American football team that represented the University of Washington during the 1915 college football season.  In its eighth season under coach Gil Dobie, the team compiled a 7–0 record, shut out five of seven opponents, and outscored all opponents by a combined total of 274 to 14. Ray Hunt was the team captain.

Washington did not play Washington State, Oregon, or Oregon Agricultural this season. Play in the Pacific Coast Conference began the following year.

Schedule

References

Washington
Washington Huskies football seasons
College football undefeated seasons
Washington football